Scott White (born March 15, 1968) is a Canadian ice hockey executive. He is currently the general manager of the Texas Stars of the American Hockey League (AHL), and is also the Director of Hockey Operations for the Dallas Stars of the National Hockey League (NHL).

White has served as the general manager of the Texas Stars of the AHL since 2009. On May 31, 2013, the Dallas Stars announced that White would take on the additional responsibility as the Director of Hockey Operations for the NHL team.

References

External links
Scott White's staff profile at Eliteprospects.com

1968 births
Living people
Dallas Stars executives
Ice hockey people from Quebec
National Hockey League executives
People from Montérégie
Quebec Nordiques draft picks